J Russell Peltz (born December 9, 1946) is an American boxing promoter. A member of the International Boxing Hall of Fame and the World Boxing Hall of Fame, Peltz has promoted fights at the Arena, Spectrum, The Blue Horizon, several Atlantic City casinos and at the 2300 Arena in South Philadelphia and the PARX Casino in Bensalem, PA.

Early life 
Peltz was born in the Wynnefield section of Philadelphia, but his family moved to Bala Cynwyd, PA, after he finished second grade.  He became a boxing fan at age 12 and saw his first live fight at 14.  A 1964 graduate of Lower Merion High School, Peltz was a Journalism major at Temple University and was named the Outstanding Male Journalism Graduate in 1968.  After his junior year at Temple, Peltz got a job on the sports copy desk at the Evening & Sunday Bulletin in Philadelphia, working the midnight shift from the summer of 1967 thru the summer of 1969.  When he couldn't get the job as the boxing writer, he left the Bulletin to become a boxing promoter. His first boxing card in Philadelphia was on September 30, 1969, with a main event at the Blue Horizon featuring Bennie Briscoe vs. Tito Marshall. Briscoe won by knockout and the Blue Horizon had a standing-room-only crowd of 1,606.

Career 
After promoting at various venues in Philadelphia for four years, including the well-known 7,000-seat Arena in West Philadelphia, Peltz was named Director of Boxing at the 18,000-seat Spectrum in South Philadelphia. Peltz became one of the most successful local boxing promoters in the world during his tenure at the Spectrum, from 1973 until 1980. Some top Philly area fighters Peltz showcased: Bennie Briscoe (who Peltz promoted for 10 years), Willie Monroe, Bobby Watts, Eugene Cyclone Hart, Stanley "Kitten" Hayward, Mike Rossman, Sammy Goss, Richie Kates, Tyrone Everett, George Benton, Curtis Parker, Jeff Chandler and Matthew Saad Muhammad.

Middleweight champion Marvelous Marvin Hagler boxed five times for Peltz at the Spectrum.  Other out-of-town fighters who boxed for Peltz at the Spectrum included: Marvin Johnson, Ernie Terrell, Earnie Shavers, Michael Spinks, Emile Griffith, Thomas Hearns, Roberto Durán, Alfredo Escalera, Jesse Burnett, Yaqui López, Billy Douglas, Eddie Mustafa Muhammad and Bobby Chacon.

When Tyrone Everett challenged Alfredo Escalera at the Spectrum for the WBC junior lightweight title in 1976, the 16,019 attendance set the record for the largest crowd ever to watch a fight indoors in Pennsylvania.  In 1978, when Bennie Briscoe met Marvelous Marvin Hagler at the Spectrum in a 10-round match, the 14,950 fans in attendance established the mark for the largest indoor crowd in Pennsylvania history for a non-championship fight.

Peltz guided a fighter to the world title for the first time in 1978 when Marvin Johnson won the WBC light-heavyweight title, stopping Mate Parlov in Marsala, Sicily.  Johnson also twice won the WBA version of the title in 1979 and 1986, respectively.  Peltz promoted Jeff Chandler, the Hall-of-Fame bantamweight champion, who gained the WBA crown in 1980 when he knocked out Julian Solís in Miami, Florida. Chandler held the title for nearly four years and nine successful defenses.

After the rise of casinos in Atlantic City in the 1970s, Peltz began to promote at the now defunct Sands Atlantic City and Resorts Atlantic City, while continuing to promote boxing shows in Philadelphia.  He promoted fight cards at most of the Atlantic City casinos:  Bally's, Harrahs Marina, Trump Castle, Caesars, The Claridge and the Playboy Hotel & Casino.

In those years, world champions Peltz promoted included: Charlie "Choo Choo" Brown (IBF lightweight champion); Gary Hinton (IBF junior welterweight champion); Charles Williams (IBF light-heavyweight); Robert Hines (IBF junior middleweight champion); and Charles Brewer (IBF super middleweight champion). Another Peltz fighter, middleweight Frank Fletcher, became one of network television's most popular fighters, boxing six times on NBC in wildly exciting brawls from 1981 through 1984.

Other Peltz fighters who challenged for world titles during those years included: Jerry Martin (light-heavyweight); Tony Thornton (super middleweight); Bryant Brannon (super middleweight); Billy Irwin (lightweight).

Through the 1980s and 1990s, Peltz became synonymous with boxing at the Blue Horizon, including an eight-year stretch (1993–2001) of consecutive sellouts in the 1,346-seat building. Peltz was a partner with New Jersey-based Main Events in promotion of the late boxing champion Arturo Gatti from 1991-2004. Peltz also guided Kassim Ouma of Uganda to the IBF junior middleweight title in 2004.  Twelve years later he guided Jason Sosa, of Camden, NJ, to the WBA junior lightweight title.

Peltz is active as manager of heavyweight Joey Dawejko.  He also works as a consultant for boxing for Joe Hand Promotions, of Feastersville, PA. In 2021, Peltz wrote and published a book (Thirty Dollars and a Cut Eye) about his 50 years in boxing. He is president of Peltz Boxing Promotions, Inc., in Philadelphia.

Personal life 
Peltz met his first wife, Patricia McKeown, in college. They were married in August, 1969, separated in June, 1975, and divorced in February, 1976. He then began dating Linda Sablosky, a classmate from Lower Merion High School.  They were married in June, 1977.  Their oldest son, Matthew, passed away in May, 2017, at the age of 38.  Their second son, Daniel, lives in Boca Raton, Florida, with his wife, Lauren.  Russell and Linda have six grandchildren.

Awards and achievements 
 Outstanding Male Journalism Graduate Temple University (1968)
 Pennsylvania Boxing Hall of Fame (1978)
 James J. Walker Memorial Award from the Boxing Writer's Association of America (1999)
 World Boxing Hall of Fame (2000)
 Philadelphia Jewish Sports Hall of Fame (2002)
 International Boxing Hall of Fame (2004)
 New Jersey Boxing Hall of Fame (2008)
 Temple University School of Communications & Theatre Hall of Fame (2010)
 Pennsylvania  Lehigh Valley Sports Hall of Fame (2015)
 Atlantic City Boxing Hall of Fame (2017)
 Lower Merion High School Distinguished Alumni (2018)
 Philadelphia Sports Hall of Fame (2020)
 Indiana Boxing Hall of Fame (2022)
 West Coast Boxing Hall of Fame Book of the Year (2022)

References

International Boxing Hall of Fame inductees
20th-century American Jews
American boxing promoters
Living people
Temple University alumni
1946 births
21st-century American Jews